Synaptonemal complex central element protein 1 is a protein that in humans is encoded by the SYCE1 gene.

Primary ovarian insufficiency can be caused by mutations in genes involved in essential steps in chromosome synapsis and recombination during meiosis.  Mutation in the autosomal gene SYCE1 that encodes synaptonemal complex element 1 protein causes a primary ovarian insufficiency phenotype in humans.  This finding highlights the importance of the synaptonemal complex and meiosis for ovarian function.

References

Further reading